Mailleroncourt-Saint-Pancras is a commune in the Haute-Saône department in the region of Bourgogne-Franche-Comté in eastern France.

Geography
The Côney forms most of the commune's northern border.

See also
Communes of the Haute-Saône department

References

Communes of Haute-Saône